Baron Willem van Dedem, also styled as Willem, Baron van Dedem, (1929–2015) was a Dutch businessman, art collector, art historian and philanthropist. He donated artworks to the National Gallery in London, the Rijksmuseum and the Mauritshuis.

After donating five works to the Mauritshuis, he was awarded both the Museum Medal and the Officer's Cross of the Order of Orange-Nassau.

He was president of the board of The European Fine Art Fair (TEFAF).

His art collection was catalogued in a 2002 book by Peter C. Sutton. A 2012 supplement by Sutton described fifteen later additions. At various times, the collection included works by Rembrandt, Pieter Claesz and Adriaen Coorte.

van Dedem died on 26 November 2015. His wife Ronny, who survived him, is an artist. They had lived for many years in London. His great uncle was the shipping magnate Daniel George van Beuningen.

Collection 

Works owned by van Dedem included:

 The Adoration of the Magi (1617), Pieter Brueghel the Younger
 Christ with the Woman Taken in Adultery (1628), Pieter Brueghel the Younger
 A Calm Sea with Ships near the Shore (c. 1624/5–79), Jan van de Cappelle
 Still Life with Tazza (1636), Pieter Claesz
 Still Life of a Bowl of Wild Strawberries (1696), Adriaen Coorte
 Still Life with Fruit and Wine Glasses on a Silver Plate, Willem Kalf
 A Young Woman Seated at a Table, Eating, Gabriel Metsu
 Brazilian Landscape with a House under Construction, Frans Post
 Three Singers (Allegory of Hearing) (1624 or 1625), Rembrandt
 Winter Landscape at Arnhem, Salomon van Ruysdael
 Peasants Dancing outside a Bohemian Inn, Roelant Savery
 Interior of a Gothis Protestant Church (1692), Emanuel de Witte

Further reading

References 

1929 births
Place of birth missing
2015 deaths
Place of death missing
Dutch art collectors
Dutch philanthropists
20th-century Dutch businesspeople
21st-century Dutch businesspeople
Officers of the Order of Orange-Nassau